Rahdar may refer to:
 Rahdar, Dashtestan, Bushehr Province
 Rahdar, Hormozgan
 Rahdar, Khuzestan
 Rahdar-e Olya, Khuzestan Province
 Rahdar-e Sofla, Khuzestan Province
 Rahdar Rural District, in Hormozgan Province